The 2020–21 China Tour was the third season of the China Tour to carry Official World Golf Ranking points. Only two events were played in 2020 because of the COVID-19 pandemic and so 2020 and 2021 were combined into a single season.

Schedule
The following table lists official events during the 2020–21 season.

Order of Merit
The Order of Merit was based on prize money won during the season, calculated in Renminbi. The leading player on the tour (not otherwise exempt) earned status to play on the 2022 European Tour.

Notes

References

External links

2020 in golf
2021 in golf
2020 in Chinese sport
2021 in Chinese sport